Choi Ki Ho (born 5 May 1991, in Hong Kong) is a Hong Kong cyclist.

Choi placed first in the UCI Track Cycling World Cup Classics Madison in Beijing, and won the 2010 Tour de Berne in Aigle, Switzerland. At the 2010 UCI Road World Championships, held in Melbourne, he placed thirty-fourth in the under-23 road race.

He competed for Hong Kong in the men's omnium at the 2012 Summer Olympics.

Choi retired at the end of the 2013 season to pursue business studies.

2011 Tour of Korea
Choi Ki Ho won the Tour de Korea at the age of 19 on 24 April 2011, becoming the youngest cyclist to do so. He completed the nine-stage race, a total distance of 1,335.9 kilometers, in a cumulative time of 33 hours 54 minutes 45 seconds.  Austrian Markus Eibegger of Tabriz Petrochemical Team was 29 seconds behind, followed by American Dugan Williams of Sanofi Aventis, a professional team, clocking 33:55:22.

References

External links
 
 
 
 

1991 births
Living people
Hong Kong track cyclists
Hong Kong male cyclists
Cyclists at the 2012 Summer Olympics
Olympic cyclists of Hong Kong
Asian Games medalists in cycling
Cyclists at the 2010 Asian Games
Asian Games silver medalists for Hong Kong
Medalists at the 2010 Asian Games